Shane Ryan may refer to:

Sportsmen
 Shane Ryan (Dublin Gaelic footballer) (born 1978), Irish dual player of hurling and Gaelic football for Dublin
 Shane Ryan (Kerry Gaelic footballer), Rathmore outfield player who is also a goalkeeper for his county team
 Shane Ryan (association footballer) (born 1993), Irish football striker for Gombak United
 Shane Ryan (swimmer), Irish swimmer in the 2016 Olympic Games

Others
 Shane Ryan (social activist) (born 1969), British social activist and writer

See also
 Shaun Ryan, football umpire
 Shawn Ryan (born 1966), writer